Cirque Rocks was a charity circus held in Auckland, New Zealand event that was organised by the Dean Lonergan Events organisation and sponsored by McDonald's restaurants. The event was held August 23–26, 2006 with 215 performers. The event was held in the Trust's Stadium in Waitakere.

It featured over 80 circus acts and X-Games performers, choreographed to a 60-piece orchestra. The theme of the night being the history of Rock 'n Roll. The festivities began to a backdrop of early Rock 'n Roll hits and through the night progressed into today's modern rock.

The event was held live at the Trusts Stadium  in Auckland on August 23, 2006, and broadcast a couple of days later on local network TV3 on Saturday, 26 August 2006.

The charities that this event raised money for were:
Ronald McDonald House
Yellow Ribbon (Prevention of Youth Suicide)
Child Cancer Foundation

Performances
These are among some of the acts performed at the Cirque Rocks event.
Plate Spinning
Holland's Motorcycle Globe of Death
Sunchasing
X-Games bikers - - Chad Kagy, Ryan Nyquist, Jamie Bestwick and Scott Cranmer.
Trampolining
Cage of Death
Ramashov Russian swings
Troupe Mayarov Fast Track Tumbling
 Motorcycle Foot Jugglers from Russia
 The Flying Wallendas (the world's greatest high wire act)

Cirque Rocks was a contemporary circus event and therefore did not use any performing animals.

Disappearance
On August 29, 2006, it was reported that a Chinese performer associated with the Chasing Sun chair balance act failed to turn up for her flight back to China. No further details are apparent and her disappearance remains a mystery.

References

External links
 google videos
flickr photos of the show

Cultural history of New Zealand
Circuses